Italy competed at the 2013 Mediterranean Games in Mersin, Turkey from the 20th to 30 June 2013.

Archery 

Men

Women

Athletics 

Medal count

Men
Track & road events

Field events

Women
Track & road events

Field events

Badminton

Basketball

Men's tournament

Team 

Alessandro Amici
Paul Billigha
Riccardo Cervi
David Cournooh
Andrea De Nicolao
Stefano Gentile
Daniele Magro
Valerio Mazzola
Riccardo Moraschini
Nicola Natali
Michele Vitali
Andrea Zerini

Standings

Results

Fifth place match

Bocce 

Lyonnaise

Pétanque

Raffa

Boxing 

Men

Canoeing 

Men

Women

Legend: FA = Qualify to final (medal); FB = Qualify to final B (non-medal)

Cycling

Fencing 

Men

Women

Football

Men's tournament

Team

Fabio Aveni
Simone Battaglia
Davide Biraschi
Mauro Bollino
Luigi Canotto
Eros Castelletto
Danilo Cataldi
Daniele Celiento
Leonardo Citti
Johad Ferretti
Andrea Fulignati
Guido Gomez
Luca Iotti
Filippo Minarini
Giuseppe Palma
Giulio Sanseverino
Michele Somma
Davide Voltan

Standings

Results

Gymnastics

Artistic 

Men
Team

Individual

Apparatus

Women
Team

Individual

Apparatus

Rhythmic

Handball

Men's tournament
Team

Pierluigi Di Marcello
Vito Fovio
Luis Felipe Gaeta
Umberto Giannoccaro
Pasquale Maione
Damir Opalic
Denis Radovcic
Matteo Resca
Francesco Rubino
Valerio Sampaolo
Michele Skatar
Tin Tokic
Dean Turkovic
Vito Vaccaro
Francesco Volpi

Preliminary round

Women's tournament
Team

Celine Auriemma
Angela Cappallaro
Cecilia Carini
Antonella Coppola
Eleonora Costa
Bianca Dal Balzo
Stefanie Egger
Rafika Ettaqui
Irene Fanton
Sandra Federspieler
Cristina Georghe
Beatrice Guerra
Cristina Lenardon
Anika Niederwieser
Giulia Pocaterra
Monika Prünster
Gaia Maria Zuin

Preliminary round

Judo 

Men

Women

Karate 

Men

Women

Rowing 

Men

Women

Sailing 

Men

Women

Shooting 

Men

Women

Swimming 

Men

Women

Table tennis 

Men

Women

Taekwondo

Men

Women

Tennis 

Men

Women

Volleyball

Beach

Indoor

Men's tournament

Team

Simone Anzani
Giorgio De Togni
Lodovico Dolfo
Marco Falaschi
Michele Fedrizzi
Andrea Galliani
Daniele Mazzone
Pierpaolo Partenio
Nicola Pesaresi
Alessandro Preti
Giulio Sabbi
Filippo Vedovotto

Standings

Results

Women's tournament

Team

Valentina Arrighetti
Cristina Barcellini
Floriana Bertone
Lucia Bosetti
Valeria Caracuta
Monica De Gennaro
Chiara De Iulio
Valentina Diouf
Raphaela Folie
Alessia Gennari
Laura Partenio
Noemi Signorile

Standings

Results

Water polo

Men's tournament

Team 

Matteo Aicardi
Marco Del Lungo
Maurizio Felugo
Niccolà Figari
Pietro Figlioli
Deni Fiorentini
Valentino Gallo
Alex Giorgetti
Nicolò Gitto
Amaurys Perez
Christian Presciutti
Olexander Sadovyy
Stefano Tempesti

Standings

Results

Water skiing 

Men

Women

Weightlifting 

Men

Women

Wrestling 

Men's Freestyle

Men's Greco-Roman

Women's Freestyle

References

Nations at the 2013 Mediterranean Games
2013
Mediterranean Games